Isobel Dixon (born 1969) is a South African poet. She is also a literary agent based in London.

Life 

Born and raised in South Africa and living now in Cambridge, England, Isobel Dixon works in London as a literary agent. She has published several poetry collections and contributed to many collaborative works and anthologies. Her poem "Plenty" now features in the CIE GCSE English Language Course as part of the poetry anthology. 

In 2000, she won the South African SANLAM Award for Poetry. In 2004, she won the Olive Schreiner Prize and the Oxfam Poems for a Better Future competition. She was commissioned to write poems by the British Film Institute in 2007.

Collections
 Weather Eye (Carapace, 2001) 
 A Fold in the Map (Salt Publishing, 2007)
 The Tempest Prognosticator (Salt Publishing, 2011)
 The Debris Field, with Simon Barraclough and Chris McCabe (Sidekick Books, 2013)

References

External links
 Isobel Dixon.com
 Review of A Fold in the Map, The Sunday Independent

1969 births
21st-century South African poets
Literary agents
Living people
South African women poets